James Dasaolu (born 5 September 1987) is a retired British track and field athlete who specialised in the 100 metres. He was the 2014 European champion over the distance.

In July 2013, he became the second fastest Briton of all time after running a 100 m time of 9.91 seconds in the British Championships. In 2014 he won his first major title, claiming the gold medal in the 100 metres at the 2014 European Athletics Championships.

Background
Born in south London to Nigerian parents, Dasaolu did not take up sprinting seriously until he was 18 when he began a leisure management degree at Loughborough.

Sprinting career

Early career
He began his career in competitive athletics relatively late, first competing in 2006; as a result he had a limited youth and junior career. However, having begun, Croydon Harrier Dasaolu made steady and significant improvements in his first few years; his 100 m personal best in 2006 was 10.75 seconds, then 10.33 seconds in 2007, and 10.26 seconds in 2008.

2008
The 2008 season saw Dasaolu rise up the national rankings and introduced to the UK Athletics warm weather training camp. Under the tutelage of coach Michael Khmel at Loughborough University and training with 2006 World Junior Champion Harry Aikines-Aryeetey and former European Junior Champion Leon Baptiste, Dasaolu won the 2008 England under-23 championships and reached the semi-finals at the British Olympic Trials.

2009
The beginning of the 2009 season showed further improvement for Dasaolu. At the seventh Graziano Della Valle meet in Italy, he recorded a new personal best of 10.15 seconds and finished in second place overall behind Aikines-Aryeetey. Two weeks later he finished with 10.25 seconds at the Papaflessia meet in Greece, second only to European season leader Dwain Chambers. A 100 m win at the European Athletics permit meet in Geneva in June placed him among the top European sprinters for the first time. His new personal best time of 10.09 seconds made him joint second, with Simeon Williamson, in the season's 100 m European rankings and improved his chances for a place on the British relay team at the Berlin World Championships.

2010
The 2010 season saw Dasaolu make his senior GB debut when he represented GB at the European Championships in Barcelona after finishing second only to Dwain Chambers in the UK trials with a time of 10.23. However he disappointed at the Championships where he stumbled through his heat with a time of 10.40 and then crashed out in the semi-finals with at time of 10.31.

2012
Dasaolu was selected by UK Athletics for the 100 metres at the 2012 Olympics. He set a season's best time of 10.13 in his heat, finishing third behind winner Usain Bolt to qualify for the semi-finals. He finished seventh in his semi-final with a time of 10.18.

2013
He began 2013 by winning a silver medal at the 2013 European Athletics Indoor Championships in the 60 metres, running a personal best of 6.48 seconds in the final, finishing centimetres behind champion Jimmy Vicaut. On 13 July at the British trials, Dasaolu ran a personal best of 9.91, the second fastest time ever by a Briton behind Linford Christie. He was selected as a member of the British squad for the 2013 World Championships in Athletics for the 100 metres and 4 x 100 metres relay. In the 100 metres Dasaolu advanced from the heats as a fastest loser before setting a time of 9.97 in the semi-final to qualify for a world-level final for the first time, where he finished in eighth with a time of 10.21.

2014
2014 started brightly for Dasaolu as he opened with a 6.50 in the 60 m at the annual Glasgow International match to start his indoor campaign. A time only 0.02 shy of his personal best achieved in the previous year at the European Indoor Championships in Gothenburg. He would later run 6.47 at the Sainsbury's Indoor Grand Prix, improving his personal best by one hundredth of a second. In the final of the Grand Prix, Dasaolu won with a time of 6.50 but pulled up 20 m from the line after a slight tear in his thigh muscle, causing him to give up his automatic selection place for the World Indoor Championships and focus on the outdoor season instead. Dasaolu won his first major senior gold in the final of the 100 m at the 2014 European Athletics Championships with a time of 10.06 seconds, beating out two-time defending champion Christophe Lemaitre

2018 
In November 2018 Dasaolu suffered an injury, rupturing his Achilles tendon. After raising money on his go fund me page. Dasaolu raised over £10000 for his surgery and recovery. However, eventually retiring from the sport

Personal bests

All information taken from IAAF profile.

See also
Great Britain at the Olympics

References

External links

1987 births
Living people
Athletes from London
English male sprinters
British male sprinters
Olympic male sprinters
Olympic athletes of Great Britain
Athletes (track and field) at the 2012 Summer Olympics
Athletes (track and field) at the 2016 Summer Olympics
World Athletics Championships athletes for Great Britain
IAAF Continental Cup winners
European Athletics Championships winners
European Athletics Championships medalists
British Athletics Championships winners
Black British sportspeople
English sportspeople of Nigerian descent